William Hicks may refer to:
Sir William Hicks, 1st Baronet (1596–1680), English Member of Parliament, Royalist officer at the Siege of Colchester 
William Hicks (British soldier) (1830–1883), British soldier who served in the Bombay army
William Hicks (Cherokee chief) (1769–c. 1837), Principal Chief of the Cherokee Nation 1827–1828
William Hicks (Royal Navy officer) (1788–1848), Naval Officer who fought at the Battle of Trafalgar
William Mitchinson Hicks (1850–1934), British mathematician and physicist
William Joynson-Hicks, 1st Viscount Brentford (1865–1932), British politician nicknamed Jix
William Woodbury Hicks (1896–1966), American philatelist, of Pennsylvania
William Harold Hicks (1888–1974), Canadian politician, Progressive Conservative party member of the Canadian House of Commons
William J. Hicks (1827–1911), American builder, architect and prison warden of North Carolina
William Robert Hicks (1808–1868), British asylum superintendent and humorist
W. W. Hicks (William Wesley Hicks, 1843–1925), American politician
William H. Hicks (born 1925), American politician in the New Jersey General Assembly
William Hicks (born 1817), 19th century emigrant to California and landowner
William Clayton Hicks, member of the Wisconsin State Senate from 1949 to 1953

Will Hicks may refer to:
Will Hicks (record producer), (born 1984) British record producer 

Bill Hicks may refer to:
Bill Hicks (1961–1994), American comedian
Bill Hicks (American football) (born 1940), head football coach for the Howard Payne University Yellow Jackets
Bill Hicks (footballer) (1899–1962), Australian rules footballer who played with Fitzroy in the Victorian Football League

Billy Hicks may refer to:
Billy Hicks (1927-2016), American moving target shooter